Nicanor Carmona (1842–1940) was a Peruvian politician. He was Minister of Finance in 1894. He was twice the mayor of Lima, first from 1910 to 1913, and second from 1915 to 1916. He was president of the President of the Senate from 1914 to 1915.

References

Peruvian Ministers of Economy and Finance
Presidents of the Senate of Peru
Mayors of Lima
1842 births
1940 deaths